Widuchowa  (formerly ) is a village in Gryfino County, West Pomeranian Voivodeship, in north-western Poland, close to the German border. It is the seat of the gmina (administrative district) called Gmina Widuchowa.

Notable residents 
 :de:Friedrich Salis (1880–1914), German Historian
 Gustav Kleikamp (1896–1952), German admiral 
 de:Otto Graff (1915–1997), German artist

References

Widuchowa